Darcy Thompson may refer to:

 D'Arcy Wentworth Thompson (1860–1948), Scottish biologist, mathematician and classics scholar
 Darcy Thompson (cyclist), Australian Paralympic cyclist